The 1975–76 Australia rugby union tour of Britain and Ireland was a series of matches played by the Australia national rugby union team (nicknamed the Wallabies). The team was referred to as the "Sixth Wallabies", although they were actually only the fifth Australian touring team to undertake a full tour of Britain & Ireland; the "Second Wallabies" of 1939–40 had to return home without playing a game when the World War II broke out.

The Wallabies played twenty-six matches between October 1975 and January 1976, including one match in the United States. Australia won nineteen games, drew one and lost six. They were generally unsuccessful in the four international matches in Europe, losing the first three and winning only the final fixture against Ireland. In their other matches they lost to Cardiff, England's Midlands (East) representative team and the Barbarians in the traditional final match of the European leg of the tour.

The squad's leadership
Australia's world-class halfback John Hipwell had first toured with the Wallabies in 1966–67 and had captained his state and country on several occasions since 1973. He was an automatic selection as captain for the 26 match tour. Hipwell would captain the team in two Tests (Scotland and Wales) and in nine mid-week matches. An injury he suffered in the North-Eastern Counties game resulted in serious damage to the cruciate ligaments in his leg, caused him to be replaced in the Wales Test and ended his playing involvement on tour after the game against the Combined Services.

Centre Geoff Shaw took over the captaincy from Hipwell and led the side in six mid-week matches as well as the England, Ireland and United States Tests. Tony Shaw took a leadership role in the forwards playing in nineteen matches and was the only back-rower to play in all Tests.

The tour manager was 33-year-old Newcastle solicitor Ross Turnbull, who had won a single Wallaby cap as a prop against Scotland on the short tour to Ireland & Scotland in 1968. The Rothmans Rugby Yearbook asserts that he managed the side "splendidly" and "did much to make his side one of the most popular ever to visit Britain".

The tour coach was 47-year-old David Brockhoff who as per Wallaby tour tradition, carried the official title of Assistant-Manager. The flamboyant Brockhoff had been capped eight times as a Wallaby between 1949 and 1951. Rothmans Rugby Yearbook stated "[He] played a big part in the team's success. He was a dynamic, driving force, often against considerable difficulties".

Tour itinerary
The tour followed a by-then well established pattern for touring teams to Europe from the Southern Hemisphere. Australia played test matches against all four Home Nations and a number of other matches against Welsh clubs and representative teams, Irish provinces, Scottish district teams and combinations of English county sides. The tour opened as was customary with a match against a university team, Oxford on this occasion, and by tradition took in a match just after Christmas against a Combined Services team selected from the Army, RAF and Royal Navy; on previous tours this had been played at Twickenham, but was now held at Aldershot.

The final fixture in Europe was another traditional match, the tourist game against the Barbarians, which had begun at the end of 1947–48 Wallaby tour as a fund-raising game. The tourists were guests a Sportsman's Luncheon at the Savoy Hotel in London where dignitaries included Sir Douglas Bader.

After leaving Europe the Wallabies played a match against the United States national rugby union team, for which the Australian players were awarded full international caps. This was the first match played by a United States national team since the 1924 Summer Olympic Games; the United States rugby union (now USA Rugby) had been founded in 1975.

Matches of the tour
Scores and results list Australia's points tally first.

Test matches

Scotland

Scotland opened the scoring against the run of play in the 26th minute with a try in the corner from Lewis Dick, set up by McGeechan and Hay. Morgan was unable to convert. Scotland's second try, just before half time, was scored by Jim Renwick after a 40-yard run when a pass from Hipwell to McLean went astray. Morgan converted this time to put Scotland 10–0 up at half time. Rothmans Yearbook commented "with luck [Australia] could have been 10 points up instead". Scotland dominated the territory in the second half but were unable to add to their score; McLean's 35-yard penalty goal for Australia was the only score of the half to make the result 10–3 to Scotland.

AUSTRALIA: Paul McLean, Paddy Batch, David L'Estrange, John Berne (rep John Weatherstone 57 mins), Laurie Monaghan, John Hipwell (c), Ron Graham, Peter Horton, John Meadows, Reg Smith, Garrick Fay, Tony Shaw, Greg Cornelsen, David Hillhouse.

SCOTLAND: Bruce Hay, Andy Irvine, Jim Renwick, Ian McGeechan, Lewis Dick, Colin Telfer, Dougie Morgan, Sandy Carmichael, Colin Fisher, Ian McLauchlan (c), Gordon Brown, Alastair McHarg, Wilson Lauder, David Leslie, George Mackie

Wales

Wales dominated the line-outs and rucks to record what was at the time their biggest win and highest score against Australia. An Edwards try from close range, converted by Fenwick, and a Fenwick penalty goal gave Wales a 9–3 half-time lead, Australia's score coming from a McLean penalty goal. The Australian captain Hipwell had to go off just before half-time with a recurrence of his knee ligament injury, a loss which Rothmans Yearbook suggested might have "affected the margin but not the result". In the second half J.J. Williams scored a hat-trick of tries with Fenwick and Martin adding a conversion each. Bevan scored a dropped goal and Wales finished 28–3 winners. Rothmans concluded that "Australia fought hard to the end, but on the day met a team which was too good for them at all points". Phil Bennett was  selected at fly-half for Wales but withdrew after suffering an injury playing for Llanelli and was replaced by John Bevan.

AUSTRALIA: Paul McLean, Paddy Batch, David L'Estrange, Geoff Shaw, Laurie Monaghan, Hindmarsh, John Hipwell (c) (rep Rod Hauser 39 mins), Ron Graham, Peter Horton, John Meadows, Reg Smith, Garrick Fay, Tony Shaw, John Lambie (rep Gary Pearse 14 mins), Greg Cornelsen.

WALES: J.P.R. Williams, J.J. Williams, Ray Gravell, Steve Fenwick, Clive Rees, John Bevan, Gareth Edwards, Graham Price, Bobby Windsor, Charlie Faulkner, Geoff Wheel, Allan Martin, Terry Cobner, Trefor Evans, Mervyn Davies (c).

England

Australia had won both international matches on the 1975 England rugby union tour of Australia but were beaten at Twickenham and failed to score a try for the third successive international on tour. Hipwell, Price and Fay were all unavailable due to injury. Hignell's two penalty goals for England to one by McLean made the half-time score 6–3. This remained unchanged until the 67th minute when England debutant Corless scored a try after chasing his own kick to make it 10–3. Five minutes later another player making his first appearance, Lampkowski, scored a try after a scrum near the Australian line and Duckham added a third try which was converted by Hignell, who also scored a penalty goal in the second half. The only Australia score in the second half was another McLean penalty goal. England's 23 points was at the time their highest score against Australia, and the 17-point winning margin equalled their record margin against the Wallabies.

AUSTRALIA: Paul McLean, Paddy Batch, Bill McKid, Geoff Shaw (c), Laurie Monaghan, John Weatherstone, Rod Hauser, Stuart Macdougall, Peter Horton, Steve Finnane, Reg Smith, David Hillhouse, Tony Shaw, Greg Cornelsen, Mark Loane.

ENGLAND: Alastair Hignell, Peter Squires, Andy Maxwell, Barry Corless, David Duckham, Martin Cooper, Mike Lampkowski, Fran Cotton, Peter Wheeler, Mike Burton, Bill Beaumont, Bob Wilkinson, Mark Keyworth, Tony Neary (c), Andy Ripley

Ireland

Australia registered their first international victory of the tour and scored three tries in beating Ireland. The first half ended with Ireland in a narrow 7–6 lead from McMaster's try and Robbie's penalty goal to two penalty goals from McLean; new Irish cap Ollie Campbell missed three penalties which might have given Ireland a more comfortable lead. In the second half the Australian pack took control and the Wallabies scored three tries through Ryan, Tony Shaw and Weatherstone, one of which was converted by McLean. Rothmans Yearbook singled out Loane who "stood out in the Wallaby pack" and Hauser who "had an excellent game at scrum-half".

AUSTRALIA: Paul McLean, John Ryan, Rex L'Estrange, Geoff Shaw (c), Laurie Monaghan, John Weatherstone, Rod Hauser, Ron Graham, Chris Carberry, John Meadows, Reg Smith, Garrick Fay, Tony Shaw, Gary Pearse, Mark Loane.

IRELAND: Tony Ensor, Tom Grace, J.A. McIlrath, Mike Gibson (c), A. W. McMaster, Ollie Campbell, John Robbie, F. McLoughlin, J. Cantrell, P. Agnew, Moss Keane, M. Molloy, Stewart McKinney, Fergus Slattery, Willie Duggan

United States

In the first game ever played by a United States national rugby union team in their own country, Australia won 24–12 but needed two late tries to make the game safe. In a game played in 83-degree heat, Australia took a 13–6 lead at half-time through Ray Price's try and three penalty goals from Jim Hindmarsh, to Oxman's two penalty goals for the home team. Hindmarsh stretched the lead to 16–6 with another penalty goal before two from Oxman brought the United States back within four points with eight minutes left. Tries from Ryan and Pearse ultimately gave the Wallabies a comfortable win although Rothmans Yearbook stated that "the losers fought back right to the end" and "were by no means outclassed".

AUSTRALIA: Hindmarsh, John Ryan, David L'Estrange, Geoff Shaw (c), Laurie Monaghan, Ken Wright, Rod Hauser, Ron Graham, Chris Carberry, John Meadows, Reg Smith, Garrick Fay, Ray Price, Gary Pearse, Tony Shaw.

United States: K. Oxman, D. Chipman, D. Stephenson, G. Schneeweis, S. Auerbach, R. Borderly (c), M. Swiderski, M. Ording, F. Khasigian, E. Swanson, C. Sweeney, G. Brackett, S. Nieubauer, T. Klein, T. Selfridge.

Other matches

Oxford University

Cardiff

Llanelli

London Counties

Midland Counties (East)

Ulster

Edinburgh

North East Counties

Gloucestershire-Somerset

Swansea

Southern Counties

Midland Counties (West)

Glamorgan

Cornwall-Devon

Combined Services

Newport

North-West Counties

Munster

Gwent

Barbarians

Barbarians: Andy Irvine , Gerald Davies, Ray Gravell, Mike Gibson, J. J. Williams, Phil Bennett, Gareth Edwards, Mike Knill, Peter Wheeler, Sandy Carmichael, Allan Martin, Gordon Brown, Trefor Evans, Mervyn Davies (c), Fergus Slattery

Touring party
Tour Manager: Ross Turnbull
Coach : David Brockhoff
Captain: John Hipwell

Squad
Test and tour appearances include appearances as a replacement, which are shown in brackets e.g. (1R)

References

Sources

 Collection (1995) Gordon Bray presents The Spirit of Rugby, Harper Collins Publishers Sydney

1975 rugby union tours
1976 rugby union tours
1975
1975
1975
1975
1975
1975
1975
1975 in Australian rugby union
1976 in Australian rugby union
1975–76 in European rugby union
1975–76 in English rugby union
1975–76 in Welsh rugby union
1975–76 in Scottish rugby union
1975–76 in Irish rugby union
1976 in American rugby union